Vesa Koskela (born 22 December 1960) is a Swedish boxer. He competed in the men's welterweight event at the 1984 Summer Olympics.

References

1960 births
Living people
Swedish male boxers
Olympic boxers of Sweden
Boxers at the 1984 Summer Olympics
People from Salla
Swedish people of Finnish descent
Welterweight boxers
20th-century Swedish people